Mary Taiwo Osijo (born 21 November 1996) is a Nigerian weightlifter, who competes in the 87 kg category and represents Nigeria at international competitions. In August 2022, she won bronze at the 2022 Commonwealth Games.

References

External links 

 

Living people
1996 births
Nigerian female weightlifters
Commonwealth Games bronze medallists for Nigeria
Weightlifters at the 2022 Commonwealth Games
Commonwealth Games medallists in weightlifting
21st-century Nigerian women
20th-century Nigerian women
Medallists at the 2022 Commonwealth Games